
Year 582 (DLXXXII) was a common year starting on Thursday (link will display the full calendar) of the Julian calendar. The denomination 582 for this year has been used since the early medieval period, when the Anno Domini calendar era became the prevalent method in Europe for naming years.

Events 
 By place 

 Byzantine Empire 
 August 14 – Emperor Tiberius II Constantine, age 47, dies (possibly from deliberately poisoned food) at Constantinople, after a 4-year reign during which Thrace and Greece have been inundated by the Slavs. He is succeeded by his son-in-law Maurice, former notary who has commanded the Byzantine army in the war against the Persian Empire.  
 Autumn – Maurice elevates John Mystacon to magister militum per Orientem. He sends a Byzantine expeditionary force to Arzanene (Armenia), where they fight a pitched battle at the river Nymphius (Batman River).Greatrex & Lieu 2002, p. 167

 Europe 
 Siege of Sirmium: The Avars, under their ruler (khagan) Bayan I, aided by Slavic auxiliary troops, capture the city of Sirmium after almost a 3-year siege. Bayan establishes a new base of operations within the Byzantine Empire, from which he plunders the Balkan Peninsula. 
 Gundoald, illegitimate son of Clotaire I, arrives with the financial support of Constantinople in southern Gaul. He claims as usurper king the cities Poitiers and Toulouse, part of the Frankish Kingdom (approximate date).  
 The Visigoths under King Liuvigild capture the city of Mérida (western central Spain), which is under the political control of its popular bishop Masona. He is arrested and exiled for 3 years.

 Persia 
 A Persian army under Tamkhosrau crosses the Euphrates River and attacks the city of Constantina (modern Turkey), but he is defeated by the Byzantines and killed.

 Asia 
 Spring – Emperor Xuan, age 52, dies after a 13-year reign and is succeeded by his incompetent son Houzhu, who becomes the new ruler of the Chen Dynasty.
 Emperor Wen of the Sui Dynasty orders the building of a new capital, which he calls Daxing (Great Prosperity), on a site southeast of Chang'an (modern Xi'an).

 By topic 

 Religion 
 April 11 – John Nesteutes becomes the 33rd bishop or patriarch of Constantinople.

Births 
 Arnulf of Metz, Frankish bishop and saint (approximate date)
 Li Mi, Chinese rebel leader during the Sui Dynasty (d. 619)

Deaths 
 April 5 – Eutychius, patriarch of Constantinople
 August 14 – Tiberius II Constantine, Byzantine Emperor
 Agathias, Greek poet and historian (approximate date)
 Ashina, empress of Northern Zhou (b. 551)
 Justinian, Byzantine general (magister militum)
 Tamkhosrau, Sassanid Persian general (marzban)
 Xuan Di, emperor of the Chen Dynasty (b. 530)

References